Cheng Hongxia (born 1978) is a female Chinese former international table tennis player.

She won a bronze medal at the 1997 World Table Tennis Championships in the women's doubles with Wang Hui.

See also
 List of table tennis players

References

Chinese female table tennis players
Living people
Table tennis players from Hebei
People from Zhengding County
1978 births
World Table Tennis Championships medalists